In geometry, the square tiling, square tessellation or square grid is a regular tiling of the Euclidean plane.  It has Schläfli symbol of  meaning it has 4 squares around every vertex.

Conway called it a quadrille.

The internal angle of the square is 90 degrees so four squares at a point make a full 360 degrees. It is one of three regular tilings of the plane. The other two are the triangular tiling and the hexagonal tiling.

Uniform colorings 
There are 9 distinct uniform colorings of a square tiling. Naming the colors by indices on the 4 squares around a vertex: 1111, 1112(i), 1112(ii), 1122, 1123(i), 1123(ii), 1212, 1213, 1234. (i) cases have simple reflection symmetry, and (ii) glide reflection symmetry. Three can be seen in the same symmetry domain as reduced colorings: 1112i from 1213, 1123i from 1234, and 1112ii reduced from 1123ii.

Related polyhedra and tilings 
This tiling is topologically related as a part of sequence of regular polyhedra and tilings, extending into the hyperbolic plane: {4,p}, p=3,4,5...

This tiling is also topologically related as a part of sequence of regular polyhedra and tilings with four faces per vertex, starting with the octahedron, with Schläfli symbol {n,4}, and Coxeter diagram , with n progressing to infinity.

Wythoff constructions from square tiling 
Like the uniform polyhedra there are eight uniform tilings that can be based from the regular square tiling.

Drawing the tiles colored as red on the original faces, yellow at the original vertices, and blue along the original edges, all 8 forms are distinct. However treating faces identically, there are only three topologically distinct forms: square tiling, truncated square tiling, snub square tiling.

Topologically equivalent tilings 

Other quadrilateral tilings can be made which are topologically equivalent to the square tiling (4 quads around every vertex). 

Isohedral tilings have identical faces (face-transitivity) and vertex-transitivity, there are 18 variations, with 6 identified as triangles that do not connect edge-to-edge, or as quadrilateral with two collinear edges. Symmetry given assumes all faces are the same color.

Circle packing 
The square tiling can be used as a circle packing, placing equal diameter circles at the center of every point. Every circle is in contact with 4 other circles in the packing (kissing number). The packing density is π/4=78.54% coverage. There are 4 uniform colorings of the circle packings.

Related regular complex apeirogons 

There are 3 regular complex apeirogons, sharing the vertices of the square tiling. Regular complex apeirogons have vertices and edges, where edges can contain 2 or more vertices. Regular apeirogons p{q}r are constrained by: 1/p + 2/q + 1/r = 1. Edges have p vertices, and vertex figures are r-gonal.

See also

 Checkerboard
 List of regular polytopes
 List of uniform tilings
 Square lattice
 Tilings of regular polygons

References 

 Coxeter, H.S.M. Regular Polytopes, (3rd edition, 1973), Dover edition,  p. 296, Table II: Regular honeycombs
 
  p36
  (Chapter 2.1: Regular and uniform tilings, p. 58-65)
 John H. Conway, Heidi Burgiel, Chaim Goodman-Strass, The Symmetries of Things 2008,

External links 
 
 
 

Euclidean tilings
Isohedral tilings
Isogonal tilings
Polyhedra
Regular tilings
Self-dual tilings
 
Regular tessellations